NBL1 North, formerly the Queensland Basketball League, is a semi-professional basketball league in Queensland, comprising both a men's and women's competition.

Champions

Results by Year 

* Grand Final was a best-of-three series

Results by teams

See also 

 NBL1
 NBL1 North

References 

champions
NBL1 North champions
NBL1
NBL1